The Madrid Central Mosque is a building located in Cuatro Caminos neighborhood of Tetuán district. During its construction, its proximity to Estrecho (literally strait, after the Strait of Gibraltar) metro station gave birth to the popular name of the Strait Mosque.

History
After its dedication as Waqf land, it still took years to collect enough individual donations to construct the mosque. Finally opened in 1988, it became the first mosque in the capital since the end of the Islamic rule in 1085.

Designed by the architect Juan Mora, it is the headquarters of the Union of Islamic Communities of Spain and the Islamic Community of Madrid. Abu-Bakr Mosque has a cooperation agreement in force with the Community of Madrid, and with the State through the Islamic Commission of Spain.

Description
The building, spread over four floors, has in addition to the mosque and offices, a nursery, a school, a library, an auditorium and a shop. It performs worship, charitable, educational, cultural and social functions, having signed an agreement with Al-Azhar University for the training and provision of imams.

See also
 Islam in Spain
 List of mosques in Spain
 List of former mosques in Spain

References

External links

UCIDE's official website

1988 establishments in Spain
Mosques in Spain
Religious buildings and structures in Madrid
Mosques completed in 1988
Buildings and structures in Cuatro Caminos neighborhood, Madrid